Izzauddin Balban-e-Iuzbaki was the Governor of Bengal during 1257-1259 CE.

History
After the death of Malik Ikhtiyaruddin Iuzbak who had rebelled from Delhi and declared himself Sultan of Bengal, Izzauddin was appointed as the Governor of Bengal by the sultan of Delhi. His short Governorship of 2 years was spent in fighting the Eastern Ganga dynasty who held most of the Province between them. During one such campaign, Tatar Khan, the Governor of Oudh, invaded North Bengal and declared himself Sultan

See also
List of rulers of Bengal
History of Bengal
History of India

References

13th-century Indian Muslims
13th-century Indian monarchs
Governors of Bengal
Year of birth missing
Year of death missing